Tonči Bašić (born 13 March 1974) is a Croatian football manager and a former player. He currently works as a director of sports for RNK Split.

References

1974 births
Living people
Footballers from Split, Croatia
Association football midfielders
Croatian footballers
RNK Split players
NK Mosor players
NK Varaždin players
NK Marsonia players
HNK Šibenik players
1. FK Příbram players
FC Spartak Vladikavkaz players
Croatian Football League players
First Football League (Croatia) players
Czech First League players
Russian Premier League players
Croatian expatriate footballers
Expatriate footballers in the Czech Republic
Croatian expatriate sportspeople in the Czech Republic
Expatriate footballers in Russia
Croatian expatriate sportspeople in Russia
Croatian football managers
RNK Split managers